The Niyamgiri is a hill range situated in the districts of Kalahandi and Rayagada in the south-west of Odisha, India. These hills are home to Dongria Kondh indigenous people. The hills have one of India's most pristine forests in the interior. It is bound by Karlapat Wildlife Sanctuary on the north-west side and Kotgarh Wildlife Sanctuary on the north-east end.

The Environment and Forest ministry of Government of India scrapped a forest clearance given to a mining firm, Vedanta Resources, to mine bauxite in the area and the mining project was scrapped. In 2013, the Supreme Court of India asked the tribal people to take the decision, in which BMP was rejected in all village council meetings.

Forest Rights controversy
The issue of controversy over the VEDANTA mining lease on the upper reaches of the Niyamgiri hills in Orissa was examined by an official committee headed by Dr N C Saxena, formerly Secretary (Planning Commission).  
Here are some excerpts: 
“ The VEDANTA site, the forested slopes of the Niyamgiri hills and the many streams that flow through them, provide the means of living for Dongaria Kondh and Kutia Kondh tribes, classified as ‘Primitive Tribal Groups’ that are eligible for special protection. The Niyamgiri massif is important for its rich biodiversity. It also plays the critical role of linking a whole series of forests and wildlife sanctuaries. The two Kondh communities regard the Niyamgiri hills as sacred and believe that their survival is dependent on the integrity of its ecosystem. The VEDANTA site is amongst the highest points in the hills and it is considered especially important as a sacred site. The proposed mining lease (VEDANTA) area is clearly the Community Forest Resource area as well as the habitat of the two Primitive Tribal Groups and their villages, as defined in the Forest Rights Act. Mining, if permitted, will directly affect almost 20 per cent of the world population of the Dongaria Kondh community. The mining operations will destroy significant tracts of forest lands. Since the Kondh are heavily dependent on forest produce for their livelihood, this forest cover loss will cause a significant decline in their economic well-being.
Mining operations of the intensity proposed in this project spread over more than 7 square km would severely disturb this important wildlife habitat and inflict severe ecological damage. Several perennial springs flow from below the top plateau, which is a part of the proposed mining lease site. VEDANTA area is one of the main sources of Vamsadhara river which would make mining on this plateau a hydrological disaster. 
These Kondh villages have been vested with recognizable community and habitat rights by GoI under section 4(1) of the TFRA, and the procedure laid down in section 6 of the TFRA must be followed by the district authorities. These rights should have been formalized as soon as the Act came into being on the 1January, 2008. As per the Preamble of the FR Act, forest dwellers are ‘integral to the very survival and sustainability of the forest ecosystem’. Therefore, in law, forests now include forest dwellers and are not limited to trees and wildlife. Since the MoEF is charged with the responsibility of implementing the Forest Conservation Act, it has to ensure that both forests and forest dwellers are protected. Section 5 of the TFRA has authorized the Gram Sabhas to ensure that their habitat is preserved from any form of destructive practices affecting their cultural and natural heritage. MoEF, as the authority under the Forest Conservation Act, cannot override the statutory authority under the Forest Rights Act, viz. the Gram Sabhas. 
From the meeting with the senior officers and the Chief Secretary, it was apparent that the district administration has been reluctant to act fairly and firmly under section 6 of the Act to formalize the rights of Kondh over the VEDANTA area, as the state government has already decided to transfer the said land for mining. 
Despite the reluctance of the district administration and state government, several Gram Sabhas have passed resolutions claiming community and habitat rights over the VEDANTA area and forwarded the same to the SDLC, as provided in section 6(1) of TFRA. From the evidence collected by the Committee, we conclude that the Orissa government is not likely to implement the FR Act in a fair and impartial manner as far as the VEDANTA area is concerned. It has gone to the extent of forwarding false certificates and may do so again in future. The VEDANTA Company has consistently violated the Forest Conservation Act, Forest Rights Act, Environmental Protection Act and the Orrisa Forest Act in active collusion with the state officials. Perhaps the most blatant example of it is their act of illegally enclosing and occupying at least 26.123 ha of Village Forest Lands within its refinery depriving tribal, dalits and other rural poor of their rights.”

References

Hills of Odisha